Bric del Dente is a 1107 metres high mountain of the Apennines located in the Italian region of Liguria.

Etymology 
Bric in Ligurian means hill or mountain, while dente in Italian means tooth.

Geography 

The mountain stands on the Adriatic / Ligurian drainage divide between Passo del Faiallo and Passo del Turchino. It belongs to the province of Genoa, in Liguria.  Its summit is a tripoint at which the valleys of Cerusa, Orba and Stura di Ovada meet. Sella Bernè (894 m) divides Bric del Dente from the neighbouring  Monte Giallo (at East, 969 m), while a saddle at 931 m divides it from Monte Reixa (westwards, 1183 m). The top of the mountain is marked by a memorial pillar overlooked by a small summit cross.

Environment 
Bric del Dente sides are generally rocky and steep save the south-western one, gentler and grassier.

Since 1985 the mountain belongs to the Parco naturale regionale del Beigua.

Access to the summit 
The mountain is easily accessible by signposted tracks departing from Sella Bernè, Passo del Faiallo or Masone.

The Alta Via dei Monti Liguri, a long-distance trail from Ventimiglia (province of Imperia) to Bolano (province of La Spezia), passes very close to the mountain's summit.

Mountain huts 
 Cascina Tröa (651 m, in Masone Valley - a tributary of Stura di Ovada)

References

External links 
 Hike description on  Comune di Masone: Masone - Bric Dente - Masone (in Italian)

Mountains of the Apennines
Mountains of Liguria
One-thousanders of Italy